Nettie Jane Fowler (May 22, 1925 – February 13, 1974) was an American film and television actress. She was known for playing the role of "Janet Culver" in the first season of the American adventure and drama television series Whirlybirds.

Born in Olympia, Washington. Spence began her career in 1948, where she played the uncredited role of a model in the film If You Knew Susie. She appeared in the game show television series Pantomime Quiz. Spence also appeared in the film The Noose Hangs High, where she played the uncredited role of the "Dentist's Assistant". She appeared in films, such as, Woman of the North Country, Words and Music, Fighting Coast Guard, East Side, West Side, Duchess of Idaho and Annie Get Your Gun. Her final film credit was from the 1955 film Ma and Pa Kettle at Waikiki.

Spence played the role of "Burma" in the adventure television series Terry and the Pirates. She worked as a antique seller. Spence joined the cast of the new syndicated adventure and drama television series Whirlybirds, in which she played the role of "Janet Culver". She was replaced by actress, Nancy Hale, who played the role of "Helen Carter" after the first season.

References

External links 

Rotten Tomatoes profile

1925 births
1974 deaths
People from Olympia, Washington
Actresses from Washington (state)
American film actresses
American television actresses
20th-century American actresses
Antiques dealers